Singular: Act II is the fourth studio album by American singer Sabrina Carpenter, released on July 19, 2019 by Hollywood Records (her last album with the label). The album is considered the second half of a two-piece project, being supplemented by her third studio album Singular: Act I (2018). Carpenter wrote and recorded the songs from 2017 to 2019, at the same time as Act I and extending beyond Act I's release. Carpenter originally intended to release the album alongside Act I as a full album entitled Singular, however, Carpenter split up the album due to differences in lyrical content.

The album was supported by the release of three singles "Pushing 20", "Exhale" and "In My Bed" as well as one promotional single "I'm Fakin". Additionally, the album features a guest appearance from American rapper Saweetie.

The album received positive reviews from music critics, and commercially the album debuted at number 138 on the US Billboard 200, becoming her lowest entry on the chart to date.

Background and release 

On June 2, 2018, Carpenter officially announced her third studio album Singular, and that it was scheduled for a winter 2018 release. On October 22, 2018, Carpenter announced that Singular would be released in two acts with Act I being released November 9, 2018, and act II "coming soon". After the release of Act I, Carpenter revealed that Act II would be released in early 2019. On December 30, 2018, Carpenter did a 2018 recap on Instagram where she played a clip of a song from the album, later revealed to be "Take Off All Your Cool". On February 13, 2019, Carpenter revealed in an interview at the Grammy Museum that the album will come along with her tour. On March 2, 2019, Carpenter performed two new songs from the album, "Pushing 20" and "Exhale" at the opening show of her tour in Orlando, Florida. She also performed the tracks throughout the tour. On May 3, 2019, Carpenter changed her Singular: Act I Instagram to Singular: Act II. This coincided with the release of "Exhale". On May 9, 2019, Nylon magazine reported that Carpenter had scheduled July 26, 2019, as the release date for Singular: Act II. On May 14, 2019, Carpenter posted a snippet of one of the album's songs on her social media, later revealed to be "Tell Em". She posted another on May 31, 2019, later revealed to be "In My Bed".

On June 4, 2019, Carpenter revealed the album artwork by sending it to her fans in multiple cities around the United States using Apple's AirDrop feature. Later that day, Carpenter formally announced the album via her social media and that the release date had been pushed up to July 19, 2019. Carpenter revealed the track list the next day. Pre-orders for the album started on June 7, 2019.

Composition 
Musically, Singular: Act II is a dance, dance-pop, pop and R&B record. Lyrically, the album discusses self-reflection and self-discovery. The opening track of the album "In My Bed" features an "electro-kissed production" and a synth-laden beat that lyrically, is about when life feels like a lot to deal with. Carpenter described it as "opening the door" to Singular: Act II. The album's second track is "Pushing 20" which Carpenter wrote for her 20th birthday in May 2019. The song is a pop song with trap and hip-hop influences that lyrically is about not listening to other's opinions and being one's self. "I Can't Stop Me" has a trap beat and mixes pop with hip-hop. Is about when a significant other tries to tell you what's good for you. It is the album's sole collaboration featuring Saweetie. "I'm Fakin" has tropical house and pop influences and is about the ups and downs of a relationship. "Take Off All Your Cool" contains pop and electropop vibes song about when someone is being someone else instead of one's self. "Tell Em" is a synth-pop song with pop and R&B sensibilities about not owing anyone an explanation for what one does. "Exhale", which Carpenter describes as her "most personal song yet" is an R&B ballad with pop undertones about anxiety. "Take You Back" is an electropop and bubblegum pop song about realizing that you don't need someone in your life anymore. The closing track of the album entitled "Looking At Me" is a dance-pop, dance, pop and hip hop song influenced by Latin and dancehall. about owning confidence and being the center of attention.

Critical reception 
Erica Russel of PopCrush called the album "a glossy, hook-laden collection of danceable pop and R&B" as well as saying the record shows Carpenter's "intimate perspectives, emotions and internal musings about everything from love to growing up". Dylan Kelly of L'Officiel said that " Each song focuses on a different issue that you will probably face at one point in you life with varied rhythms and beats that allow for different emotions to consume you as you make your way through the album." Brendan Wetmore of Paper said the album is "a culmination of pop eras — a rich plurality that separates itself from anything modern hit-writing has tried to glue together in recent years" and that it is a "truly great standalone pop record".  Kristine Hope Kowalski of YsbNow said "Act II is a satisfying follow-up to the first album installment, filled with empowering jams and emotional moments that take the whole listening experience to the next level. And while we aren't left on a musical cliffhanger, it's clear that the curtain isn't falling with this thrilling release." Tatiana Brown of Affinity gave the album a 5/5 and said it "Is The Album Everyone Needs To Hear."

Promotion 
In support of both Singular: Act I and Singular: Act II, Carpenter embarked on the Singular Tour in March 2019.

Singles 
"Pushing 20" was released as the album's lead single on March 8, 2019. The song was released ahead of Carpenter's 20th birthday and was eighth to be performed on the Singular Tour. Larisha Paul of Earmilk commented on the song saying "The single shows Carpenter continuing to tap into production areas previously unexplored within her discography, with its bouncy, bass-heavy production drawing heavily on hip-hop influenced trap elements while holding true to a distinct pop sound".

"Exhale" was released as the album's second single on May 3, 2019. Carpenter described the song as being her most personal song yet and was performed as the encore on the Singular Tour. The song received a music video, directed by Mowgly Lee, released on May 17, 2019. On June 7, 2019, Singular: Act II was made available for pre-order, and the third single, "In My Bed", was released alongside. The music video for the song was released through the Marie Claire Magazine on June 28, 2019.

Promotional single 
The album's first promotional single, "I'm Fakin", was released on July 12, 2019, a week before the album's release.

Commercial performance 
Singular Act II debuted in the lower regions of the US Billboard 200 chart, at number 138, making it her lowest charting album to date on the Billboard 200. It peaked at number 53 on the UK Downloads Chart, failing to enter the UK Albums Chart. It performed poorly on most charts it appeared on, but it managed a top 20 peak on the Australian Digital Albums chart, at number 13. The last track on the album, "Looking at Me", was the most successful song from the album with currently more than 100 million streams on Spotify.

Track listing 

Notes

  signifies an also vocal producer
  signifies a vocal producer
  signifies an executive producer
  signifies a co-producer
  signifies an additional producer

Credits and personnel 
Credits adapted from the liner notes of Singular: Act II.

Recorded, engineered, mixed and mastered at 

 Los Angeles, California 
 Venice, California 
 Burbank, California 
 Defi Studios
 Hollywood Hills, California 
 Studio Borgen
 New York City 
 Virginia Beach, Virginia 
 Sydney, Australia

Vocals 

 Sabrina Carpenter — vocals , backing vocals 
 CJ Baran — backing vocals 
 Trevor Brown — backing vocals 
 Johan Carlsson — backing vocals 
 Warren "Oak" Felder — backing vocals 
 Ross Golan — backing vocals

Instrumentation 

 Nils-Petter Ankarblom — synthesizer 
 Trevor Brown — bass, guitar 
 David Bukovinszky — cello 
 Mattias Bylund — synthesizer 
 Gunhild Carling — trumpet 
 Johan Carlsson — electric guitar , synthesizer, guitar 
 Jonas Jeberg — instrumentation 
 Mattias Johansson — violin 
 Zaire Koalo — drum programming 
 Mauricio Rengifo — keyboard, synthesizer 
 Andrés Torres — keyboard, synthesizer, electric guitar

Production 

 Johan Carlsson — production, vocal production 
 Warren "Oak" Felder — production 
 Jonas Jeberg — production 
 Mike Sabath — production, vocal production 
 Stargate — production 
 Sidney Swift — production 
 Mauricio Rengifo — production 
 Andrés Torres — production 
 Trevor Brown — co-production 
 Zaire Koalo — co-production 
 Dayyon Alexander Drinkard — additional production 
 Steph Jones — vocal production 
 Noah Passovoy — vocal production 
 Danny D — executive production 
 Tim Blacksmith — executive production

Technical 

 Chris Gehringer — mastering 
  Eric J. Dubowsky — mixing 
 Serban Ghenea — mixing 
 Mike Sabath — mixing 
 Sidney Swift — mixing, programming 
 CJ Baran — programming 
 Johan Carlsson — programming 
 Warren "Oak" Felder — programming , engineering 
 Mikkel Eriksen — programming, recording 
 Mauricio Rengifo — programming, arranging 
 Andrés Torres — arranging 
 Connor L. Barkhouse — engineering 
 John Hanes — engineering 
 Keith Sorrells — assistant engineers

Design
 Amber Park – creative direction, design
 Kieren Welsh – design assistant
 Mr. Iozo – photography

Charts

Release history

References 

2019 albums
Sabrina Carpenter albums
Hollywood Records albums
Sequel albums
Albums produced by Johan Carlsson